Oxentea is a village in Dubăsari District, Moldova.

References

Villages of Dubăsari District
Populated places on the Dniester